Restomwell Khriam (born 9 March 1986) is an Indian professional footballer who plays as a defender for Rangdajied United F.C. in the I-League.

Career
Khriam made his professional debut in the I-League with Rangdajied United F.C. on 22 September 2013 against Prayag United S.C. at the Salt Lake Stadium in which he started and played the full match as Rangdajied United lost 0–2.

Career statistics

References

External links 
 Profile.

1986 births
Living people

Indian footballers
Rangdajied United F.C. players
Association football defenders
Footballers from Meghalaya
I-League players